The Summa Logicae ("Sum of Logic") is a textbook on logic by William of Ockham. It was written around 1323.

Systematically, it resembles other works of medieval logic, organised under the basic headings of the Aristotelian Predicables, Categories, terms, propositions, and syllogisms.  These headings, though often given in a different order, represent the basic arrangement of scholastic works on logic.

This work is important in that it contains the main account of Ockham's nominalism, a position related to the problem of universals.

Book I. On Terms

Book II. On Propositions

Book III.  On Syllogisms

Part I.  On Syllogisms

Part II.  On Demonstration

 These 41 chapters are a systematic exposition of Aristotle's Posterior Analytics.

Part III.  On Consequences

 The first 37 chapters of Part II are a systematic exposition of Aristotle's Topics.  In Part III, Ockham deals with the definition and division of consequences, and provides a treatment of Aristotle's Topical rules.  According to Ockham a consequence is a conditional proposition, composed of two categorical propositions by the terms 'if' and 'then'. For example, 'if a man runs, then God exists' (Si homo currit, Deus est).  A consequence is 'true' when the antecedent implies the consequent. Ockham distinguishes between 'material' and 'formal' consequences, which are roughly equivalent to the modern material implication and logical implication respectively.  Similar accounts are given by Jean Buridan and Albert of Saxony.
 Chapters 38 to 45 deal with the Theory of obligationes.
Chapter 46 deals with the Liar Paradox

Part VI.  On Fallacies (in 18 chapters)
Part IV, in eighteen chapters, deals with the different species of fallacy enumerated by Aristotle in Sophistical Refutations (De sophisticis elenchis).

Chapters 2-4 deal with the three modes of equivocation.
Chapters 5-7 deal with the three types of amphiboly.
Chapter 8 deals with the fallacies of composition, and division.
Chapter 9 deals with the fallacy of accent.
Chapter 10 deals with the fallacy of 'figure of speech'.
Chapter 11 deals with the fallacy of accident.
Chapter 12 deals with the fallacy of affirming the consequent.
Chapter 13 deals with secundum quid et simpliciter.
Chapter 14 deals with Ignoratio elenchi or irrelevant thesis.
Chapter 15 deals with begging the question (petitio principii).
Chapter 16 deals with false cause (non-causam ut causam)
Chapter 17 deals with the fallacy of many questions (plures interrogationes ut unam facere)>
Ockham ends (chapter 18) by showing how all these fallacies err against the syllogism.

See also  
 Adam de Wodeham (wrote foreword  to Sum of Logic)  
 Summa logicae by Lambert d'Auxerre
 Summa Theologica by Thomas Aquinas

Notes

References
 Ockham's Theory of Terms : Part I of the Summa Logicae, translated and introduced by Michael J. Loux, University of Notre Dame Press, Notre Dame, IN, 1974.  Reprinted, St. Augustine's Press, South Bend, IN, 1998.
 Ockham's Theory of Propositions : Part II of the Summa Logicae, translated by Alfred J. Freddoso and Henry Schuurman and introduced by Alfred J. Freddoso, University of Notre Dame Press, Notre Dame, IN, 1980.  Reprinted, St. Augustine's Press, South Bend, IN, 1998.
 Longeway, John Lee (2007), Demonstration and Scientific Knowledge in William of Ockham, University of Notre Dame Press, Notre Dame, IN.  A translation of Summa Logicae III-II : De Syllogismo Demonstrativo, with selections from the Prologue to the Ordinatio.
 Boehner, P. (1952), Medieval Logic, Manchester University Press.

External links

 Charles Sanders Peirce (1869), Translation and commentary on selected passages from Ockham, Peirce Edition Project.
 Spade's translation of parts of Summa Book I.
 Summa Logicae, full text in Latin and English.

Occamism
Logic books
Term logic
History of logic
1320s books
Medieval philosophical literature
Scholasticism
Treatises